Cory Parr (born 2 November 1987) is a retired American tennis player.

Parr has a career high ATP singles ranking of 779 achieved on 7 June 2010. He also has a career high ATP doubles ranking of 272 achieved on 5 July 2010. He won 15 professional futures doubles titles with multiple partners.

Parr made his ATP main draw debut at the 2011 Winston-Salem Open in the doubles draw, partnering with Treat Huey.

Parr was a three time All American at Wake Forest University. He (along with partner Steven Forman) won the program's first ever national championship with a win at the 2008 ITA National Indoor tournament. He reached as high as number 9 in the national singles rankings in 2009. In 2009, Parr also reached the number 1 spot in the college tennis national doubles rankings. He currently holds the most wins in program history in both singles and doubles.  In 2017, Parr rejoined the program as a volunteer assistant coach shortly after the enrollment of his juniors pupil, Sean Patrick Hannity. In 2020 Parr completed his Masters in Business Administration at Wake Forest University.

References

External links
 
 

1987 births
American male tennis players
Living people
People from Jericho, New York
Wake Forest Demon Deacons men's tennis players
Tennis people from New York (state)